The 2022 UniSport Nationals, was a national multi-sport event held from 24 September to 30 September 2022 in Perth, Western Australia.

More than 5,000 student athletes from 39 universities participated at the event. The University of Sydney topped the pennant tally, with the University of Technology Sydney and the University of Melbourne finishing second and third, respectively. Bond University was awarded the Doug Ellis Per Capita Trophy, and Western Sydney University was awarded the John White Spirit Trophy.

Venues

The 2022 UniSport Nationals was hosted across a number of venues in the Perth metropolitan area.

Pennant tally

Awards

Overall

North region

South region

East region

West region

Partnerships

See also
Sport in Australia

References

External links
 UniSport Nationals website

UniSport
UniSport Nationals